Jeffrey, Geoffrey, Jeff, or Geoff Davis may refer to:

Politics
Jefferson Davis (1808–1889), President of the Confederate States of America
Jeff Davis (Arkansas governor) (1862–1913), U.S. Senator and 20th Governor of Arkansas
Jeffrey O. Davis, Wisconsin Court of Appeals judge
Geoff Davis (born 1958), U.S. Congressman representing Kentucky's 4th district
Geoff Davis (Australian politician) (born 1931), Tasmanian politician

Sports
Jeff Davis (American football) (born 1960), professional NFL football player
Jeff Davis (gymnast) (born 1954), British Olympic gymnast
Jeff Davis (racing driver) (born 1959), American racing driver
Jeff Davis (ski jumper) (born 1958), American ski jumper

Other people
Jeff B. Davis (born 1973), American actor, comedian and singer
Jeff Davis (writer) (born 1975), American television writer and producer
Geoffrey Davis (doctor) (died 2008), Australian doctor

Places 
Jeff Davis County, Georgia
Jeff Davis County, Texas

See also 
 Geoff Davies (disambiguation)
 Geoff Davis (disambiguation)
 Jeffrey Davies (disambiguation)
 Jefferson Davis (disambiguation)

Davis, Jeff